The Wolf salute or the Grey Wolf salute is a Turkish nationalist and Pan-Turkic hand symbol. It is used by nationalists and groups regardless of political views and it is not just used by the Grey Wolves.

Origins 
The grey wolf salute has pre-Islamic roots and it comes from the role of grey wolves in Turkic mythology, it has been attributed to Turkic peoples from Buddhist culture. Historical studies have shown that it was used by various Turkic peoples such as Huns, Kipchaks, and Pechenegs who migrated Westwards using this sign to represent their lineage. This symbol is also found in the Shahnameh of the 10th-century Iranian poet Ferdowsi, which includes miniatures of Turkic women making the grey wolf sign. In China, a 6th-century statue of a Turkic khan making the grey wolf sign is present. It was found in a cave and dates back to the pre-Islamic Göktürks period. Even though it has un-Islamic history and is viewed as kufr or shirk by some hardline Muslims, Alparslan Türkeş constantly tried to Islamize it to make it fit his Turkish-Islamic nationalism ideology.

Usage 
Although it is commonly associated with the MHP and Grey Wolves, it is actually used by Turkish nationalists and groups from all political views. CHP Leader Kemal Kılıçdaroğlu once greeted his supporters with a gray wolf sign while he was going to a rally in Kayseri on April 16. Recep Tayyip Erdoğan reacted to it by saying "The gray wolf sign made by the CHP leader cannot be erased from my memory", and Kılıçdaroğlu responded back with "We are also nationalists, we are also nationalists."

Meral Akşener, leader of the Good Party, also frequently makes the symbol on many occasions.

Recep Tayyip Erdoğan once sparked controversy when he made the gesture at a rally in Mersin before changing it with the Rabia sign almost instantly. Many saw it as a trick he used to get votes from Turkish nationalists.

Members of the Ataman Brotherhood, a Neo-Nazi group active mostly against Arab immigrants in Turkey, make the wolf salute alongside the Nazi salute.

Legality 
In Austria and France, it is banned. Many German politicians from both the right-wing and left-wing proposed to ban the wolf salute.

References 

Turkic mythology
Mongol mythology
Nationalist symbols
Fascist symbols
Hand gestures
Salutes
Turkish nationalism
Pan-Turkism
Pan-Mongolism
Turanism
Kemalism